Edwin J. Templeton (December 25, 1891 – August 25, 1967) was an American politician in the state of Washington. He served in the Washington House of Representatives from 1925 to 1933. He was Speaker of the House from 1931 to 1933.

References

1967 deaths
1890s births
Republican Party members of the Washington House of Representatives
Politicians from Vancouver, Washington
20th-century American politicians